The Vivo NEX 3 and Vivo NEX 3 5G are Android phablets developed by Vivo which were unveiled on 16 September 2019.

Specifications

Design
The NEX 3 and NEX 3 5G both have an aluminum frame and curved Gorilla Glass on the back and Schott Xensation® Up glass on the front. The curved edges of the display do not allow for physical power and volume buttons; pressure-sensitive haptic keys are implemented instead. A small button at the top of the device is situated next to the pop-up camera mechanism and is used for hard reset and screen lock only.

Hardware & Software
Internally, the Snapdragon 855+ and Adreno 640 are used, with a 4500 mAh battery powering both. The 5G model also has a vapor chamber dedicated to the modem. The NEX 3 is available with 128 GB of non-expandable UFS 3.0 storage and 8 GB of RAM, while the NEX 3 5G is available with 256 GB of non-expandable UFS 3.0 storage and 8 or 12 GB of RAM. Both can quick charge at 44W via USB-C, but do not have wireless charging. Biometric options comprise an updated in-display optical fingerprint reader and facial recognition. The phones' rear cameras are housed in a centered circular module, consisting of a 64 MP main sensor, a 13 MP ultrawide sensor and a 13 telephoto sensor. A pop-up camera hides the 16 MP front sensor and a flash. The mechanism has been improved and is now faster and more durable, taking 0.65 seconds to operate. Both devices have one screen, lacking their predecessor's dual-screen functionality. The Vivo NEX 3 and NEX 3 5G have a 6.89" (175mm) FHD+ HDR10 display with a resolution of 1080 x 2256 pixels and a screen-body ratio of 93.6%. A Samsung-made Super AMOLED panel is used on both with a curved "Waterfall" design akin to the Mate 30 Pro's. Edge detection and palm rejection are implemented to prevent accidental touches. The phones' rear cameras are housed in a centered circular module, consisting of a 64 MP main sensor, a 13 MP ultrawide sensor and a 13 telephoto sensor. OIS is not present on any of the sensors. A pop-up camera hides the 16 MP front sensor and a flash. The mechanism has been improved and is now faster and more durable, taking 0.65 seconds to operate. Both phones run on Android 9.0 "Pie" with Vivo's Funtouch 9.1 skin.

Successor
Vivo announced the NEX 3S 5G on 10 March 2020 as a hardware revision of the NEX 3 5G. The device features an upgraded Snapdragon 865 SoC, Android 10 with Funtouch 10 and HDR10+ support for the display, and benefits from newer LPDDR5 RAM, UFS 3.1 and Bluetooth 5.1. The design remains the same, although there is now an orange color variant.

References

Android (operating system) devices
Phablets
Mobile phones introduced in 2019
Mobile phones with multiple rear cameras
Vivo smartphones
Mobile phones with 4K video recording
Discontinued flagship smartphones